In law, nonacquiescence is the intentional failure by one branch of the government to comply with the decision of another to some degree.  It tends to arise only in governments that feature a strong separation of powers, such as in the United States, and is much rarer in governments where such powers are partly or wholly fused. Nonacquiescence may lead to a constitutional crisis, given certain critical situations and decisions.

In the United States, federal agencies might practice nonacquiescence by refusing to accept the validity of unfavorable court decisions as binding precedent. Exceptionally, the Social Security Administration and the Internal Revenue Service openly declare such conduct. Executive nonacquiescence has been heavily criticized by the federal courts, as well as the American Bar Association.

The U.S. Internal Revenue Service (IRS) uses the term nonacquiescence in its actions on decision to indicate that the IRS disagrees with a court ruling and will not follow its precedent nationwide. In some cases of nonacquiescence, the IRS may follow the decision's precedent within the jurisdiction of the case in question, but not apply it in other jurisdictions.

Notes

See also

 Acquiescence, an unrelated legal term

Legal doctrines and principles